The British International School, Phuket (BISP) is an English-medium, co-educational, day and boarding school, established in 1996. The 44 acre (99 rai) campus includes eight boarding houses, primary and secondary schools, and sports facilities including swimming pools, tennis courts, football pitches, and golf centre. The student population consists of 850 day and boarding students, with 60 nationalities represented.

Curriculum
The school provides a pre-school, primary and secondary school education. After Early Years, Key stages 1, 2 and 3 are based on the National Curriculum of England and Wales. Students then complete the two-year IGCSE programme in Years 10 and 11, followed by the IB Diploma programme in Years 12 and 13.

Teaching faculty
The school has 100 full-time and five part-time teachers.

Notable students and alumni
 Amanda Obdam - Thai model and beauty pageant titleholder who was crowned Miss Universe Thailand 2020.
 Rachel Peters - Filipino-British model, host, and beauty pageant titleholder who was crowned Miss Universe Philippines 2017

References

External links

 British International School, Phuket

 

Private schools in Thailand
Phuket province
Educational institutions established in 1996
1996 establishments in Thailand
Cambridge schools in Thailand
International Baccalaureate schools in Thailand
Boarding schools in Thailand
British international schools in Thailand